The Central National Bank Building is a ten-story building located at 103 Southwest Adams Street in downtown Peoria, Illinois, United States. It was designed by the architectural firm of Daniel Burnham in 1913-1914; Burnham himself had died two years before its completion, and at the time his office was the largest architecture firm in the world. The building has a Renaissance Revival design, a popular style at the time. The design features pilasters dividing the windows on the first two floors, spandrels above the first-floor windows, and terra cotta cornice lines above the second and third floors.

The building was added to the National Register of Historic Places on December 18, 1978.

Notes

National Register of Historic Places in Peoria County, Illinois
Buildings and structures in Peoria, Illinois
Bank buildings on the National Register of Historic Places in Illinois
Skyscraper office buildings in Illinois
Skyscrapers in Illinois
Buildings and structures completed in 1914
1914 establishments in Illinois